Alu is an unclassified Loloish language of Yunnan, China. It is spoken in Jinping Miao, Yao, and Dai Autonomous County, Lüchun County, Jiangcheng Hani and Yi Autonomous County, and Yuanyang County, Yunnan. The Alu are also referred to by other ethnic groups as Luwu 鲁乌 or Luowu 倮乌. There are also 500 to 600 Alu people in two villages of Ou Tay District, Phongsali Province, Laos.

The Alu also have a mouth organ with five pipes that they play during the "Abei festival 阿卑节" ("maiden festival").

Classification
Hsiu (2017) suggests that Alu may be related to Lalo, but that this is uncertain due to the lack of data.

Distribution
In Jinping County, Alu is spoken in Yakouzhe Village 丫口遮村, Laojizhai Township 老集寨乡 (in the villages of Luopan 罗盘, Tiantou 田头, Huilongzhai 回龙寨, Laozhai 老寨, Zhongzhai 中寨, Xihadi 西哈底, Heishan 黑山, Amilong 阿咪笼, Kabianzhai 卡边寨, Anlezhai 安乐寨, Nanlu 南鲁, etc.) (Jinping County Ethnic Gazetteer 2013:101). There are 1,264 households and 5,307 persons as of 2005.

Alu is also spoken in Hama Village 哈马村 of Huangcaoling Township 黄草岭乡, and Xinjie Town 新街镇, Yuanyang County. It is also spoken in Dashuigou 大水沟, Lüchun County.

References

Loloish languages
Languages of China